Sardin  is a Syrian village located in Qurqania Nahiyah in Harem District, Idlib.  According to the Syria Central Bureau of Statistics (CBS), Sardin had a population of 517 in the 2004 census.

References 

Populated places in Harem District